The 1916 U.S. National Championships (now known as the US Open) took place on the outdoor grass courts at the West Side Tennis Club, Forest Hills in New York City, United States. The men's singles tournament ran from 28 August until 5 September while the women's singles and doubles championship took place from 5 June to 12 June at the Philadelphia Cricket Club in Chestnut Hill. It was the 36th staging of the U.S. National Championships, and the only Grand Slam tennis event of the year.

Finals

Men's singles

 R. Norris Williams defeated  William Johnston  4–6, 6–4, 0–6, 6–2, 6–4

Women's singles

 Molla Bjurstedt defeated  Louise Hammond Raymond  6–0, 6–1

Men's doubles
 Bill Johnston /  Clarence Griffin defeated  Maurice McLoughlin /  Ward Dawson 6–4, 6–3, 5–7, 6–3

Women's doubles
 Molla Bjurstedt /  Eleonora Sears defeated  Louise Hammond Raymond /  Edna Wildey 4–6, 6–2, 10–8

Mixed doubles
 Eleonora Sears /  Willis Davis defeated  Florence Ballin /  Bill Tilden 6–4, 7–5

References

External links
Official US Open website

 
U.S. National Championships
U.S. National Championships (tennis) by year
U.S. National Championships (tennis)
U.S. National Championships (tennis)
U.S. National Championships (tennis)
U.S. National Championships (tennis)
U.S. National Championships (tennis)
U.S. National Championships (tennis)